Lido Palace (September 27, 1997 - July 16, 2020) was a Thoroughbred racehorse who competed successfully in Chile and the United States.

In 2000 he was elected as Horse of the Year in his native Chile, after become the first Chilean Triple Crown winner (Dirt). He continued his career in the United States, where he most notably won back-to-back runnings of the prestigious Grade I Woodward Stakes, defeating the 2000 Horse of the Year and two-time Breeders Cup Classic winner Tiznow in the 2001 edition, as well as the Whitney Handicap, defeating the multiple graded stakes winner Albert the Great.

Lido Palace was named Horse of the Year in Chile.

Retired to stud duty, Lido Palace began his stallion career at Lambholm South near Ocala, Florida. Among his progeny is Vineyard Haven, winner of the Grade I  Champagne and Hopeful Stakes in 2008. He was sold as a two-year-old in a private deal to Godolphin for a reported $12 million.

In 2009-2011, he served in Northview, Pennsylvania, and was subsequently sent to 2012 season at South America Haras el Centauro in Peru. Andrés Bezzola, owner of Haras el Centauro, noted that the presence of Lido Palace is a valuable contribution to Peruvian breeding.

On July 16, 2020, the death of Lido Palace was announced, the news was given by its owner Andrés Bezzola. He was 23 years old.

Pedigree

References

 Lido Palace's pedigree and partial racing stats

1997 racehorse births
Thoroughbred family 4-p
Racehorses bred in Chile
Racehorses trained in Chile
Racehorses trained in the United States